Xhuljo Tushi (born 5 September 1998) is an Albanian footballer who plays as a forward for KF Oriku in the Kategoria Superiore.

Career

Partizani Tirana
In August 2019, Tushi moved to Albanian Superliga club Partizani Tirana on a free transfer. He made his competitive debut for the club on 18 September 2019, tallying 51 minutes in a 3-0 Cup victory over Vora.

References

External links
Xhuljo Tushi at Football Database

Flamurtari Vlorë players
KF Bylis Ballsh players
KF Apolonia Fier players
FK Partizani Tirana players
KF Oriku players
Kategoria Superiore players
Kategoria e Parë players
Association football forwards
Footballers from Vlorë
Albanian footballers
1998 births
Living people